This is a list of films which placed number one at the weekend box office in Japan for the year 2015. It lists the films with the highest box office gross and when the film with the highest gross is not also the film with the highest attendance, both are listed.

Highest-grossing films

See also
List of Japanese films of 2015

References

2015
2015 in Japanese cinema
Japan